Elachista istanella is a moth of the family Elachistidae. It is found in Spain.

References

istanella
Moths described in 1987
Moths of Europe